Raymond Parks (June 5, 1914 June 20, 2010) was an American stock car racing team owner. He was the owner of Red Byron's car which won the inaugural NASCAR Strictly Stock Series championship in 1949. Parks was announced as one of the members of the 2017  NASCAR Hall of Fame class.

Background
Parks was the first child of Alfred and Leila Parks and great-great-nephew of settler Benny Parks, who found gold in the state of Georgia in the early nineteenth century.  Born in Dawsonville, Georgia on June 5, 1914, Raymond was the oldest of his father's sixteen children, six of whom were born to Leila, and ten of whom were born to Leila's sister, Ila.  Parks left home at age 14 and began hauling moonshine.  He served nine months of a one-year and one-day sentence in the federal penitentiary in Chillicothe, Ohio, from 1936 to 1937. Parks served in World War II during the famous Battle of the Bulge in Belgium. He served in the 99th Infantry Division and was briefly stationed at Fort Benning, Georgia. Parks bought a new tripple-white Cadillac Eldorado Biarritz in 1979 and owned it until his death in 2010.

Racing career
Most famous for being a moonshine runner who helped to start NASCAR, he is recognized as the first "team" owner in stock car racing. Prior to the founding of NASCAR, Parks was the car owner for moonshine runner and nephews Lloyd Seay and Roy Hall as far back as 1938. In 1948–1949, with Red Byron as the driver Parks's cars won the first two NASCAR Championships ever awarded; the Modified class in 1948, and the above-mentioned championship in 1949.

Death
Parks died on June 20, 2010 at the age of 96. Parks was the last living member of the group who created NASCAR during a meeting at the Streamline Hotel in Daytona Beach, Florida in 1947.

Awards
He was one of eight drivers inducted in the first class of the Georgia Racing Hall of Fame in 2002, along with his cousin Lloyd Seay, Byron, Tim Flock, and Bill Elliott. He was inducted in the International Motorsports Hall of Fame in 2009. Parks was inducted into the NASCAR Hall of Fame as a member of the class of 2017.

References

External links
 
 Raymond Parks, Nascar Pioneer, Dies at 96, The New York Times, 21 June 2010

1914 births
2010 deaths
People from Dawsonville, Georgia
Sportspeople from the Atlanta metropolitan area
NASCAR team owners
NASCAR Hall of Fame inductees